Urma Sellinger is the debut full-length album of Swedish Post-hardcore band Urma Sellinger. The album was produced by British recording producer Matt Hyde at Lunatic Music in Gävle, Sweden and at Bro Studios in London, United Kingdom. Urma Sellinger announced in February 2011 that Hyde will be working with the band again after working on the EP “Live Laugh Love.”

History
While in production, bass player Axel Vålvik departed from the band due to personal reasons.

In August 2011 Urma Sellinger published “Plastic Smile”, a song from the album,  at Facebook and MySpace. On December 8, 2011 the band released the single “For Those We've Lost” as a digital download on iTunes, Spotify and Amazon. The song aired at Bandit Rock as a pre-listen song on November 22, 2011. Some songs are aired on Australian online radio podcast The Pit FM.

Urma Sellinger was finally released on January 26, 2012 as physical copy and as a download. The album's track list consists of 11 tracks including “Far from Sandra” and “Rise to the Challenges” from the high-acclaimed EP “Live Laugh Love”. The cover artwork was designed by Joensuu based Century Designs.

Track list

Credits 

Urma Sellinger
 Olle Johansson  – vocalist
 Alex Borg – vocalist
 Eric Lindqvist – guitarist
 Andree Borg – GUITARist
 John Eriksson – drummer
 Axel Vålvik – bassist (till the end of May 2011)

Production
 Matt Hyde (producing, mixing, engineering)
 Cover Artwork by Century Designs

External links 
 Urma Sellinger at Spirit of Metal webzine

References 

2012 albums
Urma Sellinger albums